Lake Iseo or Iseo lake, also known as Sebino, is the fourth largest lake in Lombardy, Italy, fed by the Oglio River.

It is in the north of the country in the Val Camonica area, near the cities of Brescia and Bergamo. The lake is almost equally divided between the provinces of Bergamo and Brescia. Northern Italy is known for its heavily industrialised towns and in between there are several natural lakes. Lake Iseo retains its natural environment, with its lush green mountains surrounding the crystal clear lake.

There are several medieval towns around the lake, the largest being Iseo and Sarnico. A notable tourism sector has emerged. A road has been carved into the side of the mountains that circumnavigates the entire lake. In the middle of the lake there are Montisola island, Loreto isle and San Paolo isle (which compound the Monte Isola municipality). There is easy access via the regular running lake ferries.

The Floating Piers, an art installation by Christo and Jeanne-Claude, was open to the public at Lake Iseo for 16 days in June and July 2016.
The Floating Piers were a series of walkways installed at Lake Iseo near Brescia. From June 18 to July 3, 2016, visitors were able to walk just above the surface of the water from the village of Sulzano on the mainland to the islands of Monte Isola and San Paolo. After the exhibition, all components were to be removed and recycled. The installation was facilitated by the Beretta family, owners of the oldest active manufacturer of firearm components in the world and the primary sidearm supplier of the U.S. Army. The Beretta family owns the island of San Paolo, which was surrounded by Floating Piers walkways. The work was a success with the Italian public and critics as well.

Since 2018, the northern portion of the lake (called Alto Sebino) has been part of the UNESCO World Biosphere Reserve of "Valle Camonica - Alto Sebino".

Hydrography 

The level of the lake is regulated by the Sarnico Dam, built in 1933 in Fosio.
The work, built in concrete and steel, is managed by the Consorzio dell'Oglio which divides the water withdrawn between irrigation uses and hydroelectric uses.

Tributaries 
In addition to the Oglio River, the lake is fed by the following creeks and streams:
 Bergamo shore: 
Borlezza, 
Rino di Vigolo,
Rino di Predore;
 Brescia shore: 
Bagnadore, 
Calchere,
Cortelo,
Opolo.

Settlements
Around the shore of the lake are some small towns:

Two smaller islands, Loreto and St. Paul, are privately owned.

See also
Italian Lakes

References

External links

 Photos and information about Lake Iseo
 Lake Iseo Information

Lakes of Lombardy
Subalpine lakes of Italy
Waterways of Italy
Province of Brescia
Province of Bergamo
Biosphere reserves of Italy